Tors Cove is a local service district and designated place in the Canadian province of Newfoundland and Labrador. It is on the east coast of the Avalon Peninsula of the island of Newfoundland, approximately 40 kilometres south of the St. John's, the provincial capital, along Route 10 (Irish Loop Drive/Southern Shore Highway). It was formerly named Toads Cove.

Geography 
Tors Cove is in Newfoundland within Subdivision U of Division No. 1.

Demographics 

Economy 
Throughout its history, its economy was sustained through the cod fishery and was the site of a codfish processing plant until the moratorium in 1991. It is also the site of a hydroelectric dam (located on Tors Cove pond) and power plant.

Attractions 
Tors Cove is on the East Coast Trail.

Government 
Tors Cove is a local service district (LSD) that is governed by a committee responsible for the provision of certain services to the community. The chair of the LSD committee is Hannah Power.

See also 
La Manche Provincial Park
List of designated places in Newfoundland and Labrador
List of local service districts in Newfoundland and Labrador

References

External links 
18-minute video showing 11-year-old Julie O'Brien describing old times in the village National Film Board of Canada 1981

Populated coastal places in Canada
Designated places in Newfoundland and Labrador
Local service districts in Newfoundland and Labrador